Imperio de cristal (English title: Crystal Empire) is a Mexican telenovela produced by Carlos Sotomayor for Televisa in 1994.
 

Starring Rebecca Jones, Alejandro Camacho, María Rubio, Ari Telch, Kate del Castillo and Ignacio López Tarso.

Plot
Sofía Vidal (Rebecca Jones), her husband Uriel (Constantino Costas) and their little daughter, Katia (Zoraida Gómez), attend a great party offered at the elegant mansion of the Lombardo family, powerful crystal entrepreneurs. After this, their life will never be the same. 

Don César (Ignacio López Tarso), the patriarch of the Lombardos, discovers in Sofía the daughter of Elena, his impossible love, who died tragically in an accident when Sofía was still a child. César, without Sofía knowing it, decides to protect her because of Elena's memory, which he cherishes still. 

César is married in second nuptials to Livia Arizmendi (María Rubio), a former actress who dreams of recovering her career. Sofía's appearance seriously worries Livia, who considers her an intruder who could displace her, just as Elena would have done in the past. Livia, who hides a terrible secret involving Sofía, plots against her, trying to keep her out of the family. 

Augusto (Alejandro Camacho), César and Livia's oldest son, is cruel and ambitious. His ultimate goal is to take hold of his father's empire by getting rid of Octavio (Alejandro Tommasi), César's son from his first marriage. Livia supports Augusto, since she hopes that once he has got the power, she will once again be able to become the great star she once was. 

Julio (Ari Telch), the third son, returns after several years of studying abroad in order to marry his all-life girlfriend, Elisa (Ivette Proal). Julio is not keen on the family businesses, being this a reason for constant arguments with his father. 

César and Livia's younger children are twins: Claudio (Germán Gutiérrez) and Narda (Kate del Castillo). Claudio suffers from infantile psychosis due to Augusto's abuse. As a result, he has been confined in a specialized institution for a long time, suffering from his family's rejection. Narda is a capricious and stubborn young woman, although she has also been a victim of her parents' lack of love. 

Augusto becomes obsessed with Sofía and is determined to have her at any price, knowing besides that this is the way for his father to name him as his successor in the enterprises. Augusto does everything to end Sofía's marriage, until finally Uriel decides to abandon her and little Katia. Sofia and Julio meet and great passion arises between them to the extent that Julio is determined to face anything, even to put an end to his relationship with Elisa. 

The rivalry between Augusto and Julio for Sofia's love lets forth a whirlwind of intrigue, corruption and violent struggle for power. Fragile, but dangerous as well, this crystal empire can be broken into a thousand pieces in the hands of the one who will try to possess it.

Cast

Main 

 Rebecca Jones as Sofía Vidal Terán de González / de Lombardo / Elena Terán de Vidal
 Alejandro Camacho as Augusto Lombardo Arizmendi
 María Rubio as Livia Arizmendi Moncada de Lombardo
 Ari Telch as Julio Lombardo Arizmendi
 Kate del Castillo as Narda Lombado Arizmendi
 Ignacio López Tarso as César Lombardo Santander

Supporting

 Aarón Hernán as Bernal Estrada
 Adriana Barraza as Flora
 Graciela Bernardos as Nora de López Monroy
 Óscar Bonfiglio as Germán Samaniego
 Fabiola Campomanes as Juanita
 Emilia Carranza as Andrea Lombardo Santander
 Constantino Costas as Uriel González
 Malena Doria as Trinidad
 Cuca Dublán as Amparo "Amparito" Romero
 Alan Fernando as Marco Aurelio Lombardo Pedret
 Cecilia Gabriela as Esther Pedret de Lombardo
 Fidel Garriga as Rogelio Herrera
 Zoraida Gómez as Katia González Vidal
 Dacia González as Renata Ocampo
 Germán Gutiérrez as Claudio Lombardo Arizmendi
 Lucero Lander as Diana Almeida
 Alicia Montoya as Antonia Moncada Vda. de Arizmendi
 Aida Naredo as Lourdes "Lulú" Morán
 Ivette Proal as Elisa Estrada Ferreiras 
 Alejandro Ruiz as Marcelo Ocampo
 Héctor Sáez as Father Ángel
 Alejandro Tommasi as Octavio Lombardo Montiel
 Amara Villafuerte as Mayra Salgado

Awards and nominations

References

External links

1994 telenovelas
Mexican telenovelas
1994 Mexican television series debuts
1995 Mexican television series endings
Spanish-language telenovelas
Television shows set in Mexico City
Televisa telenovelas